Robert Galloway and Nathaniel Lammons were the defending champions but only Lammons chose to defend his title, partnering Hunter Reese. Lammons lost in the first round to Sekou Bangoura and Sebastian Korda.

Ariel Behar and Gonzalo Escobar won the title after defeating Antonio Šančić and Tristan-Samuel Weissborn 6–2, 6–4 in the final.

Seeds

Draw

References

External links
 Main draw

Oracle Challenger Series - Newport Beach - Men's Doubles
2020 Men's Doubles